Grace Matata is a Tanzanian afro-soul singer. She released her debut album Nyakati in 2013.

Career 
Matata writes and performs music that is 'a unique blend of Swahili soul, R&B, and jazz.' Her career began in 2010 when she signed with the record label Music Lab (M-Lab)/Media Kings and released the singles "WIMBO" and "Freesoul." The former song was nominated for a Teen Extra Award that year.

Matata released her first album, titled Nyakati (meaning 'times' in Swahili), in 2013 to critical acclaim. An active part of the Dar es Salaam and East African music scene, she released a series of singles between 2015 and 2019 and was nominated for a 2015 Kilimanjaro Music Award.

Following her success, Matata signed a deal with Tanzanian management company Panamusiq in 2017. In 2020, she began working with the Dar es Salaam-based a talent management and entertainment company Stargaze Management.

In 2020, she released her EP Rebirth.

Matata is an ambassador for UNICEF Tanzania; for World Children's Day in 2018, she released a song with the organization called "Baby."

Discography 
Adapted from Apple Music.

Albums

 Nyakati (2013)
 Rebirth EP (2020)

Singles

 "Tabibu" (2015)
 "Utanifaa" (2016)
 "Dakika Moja" feat. Wakazi (2017)
 "Baby" (2019)

References

External links

 
 
 
 
Learning And Relearning What Love Is Over Time Grace Matata at TEDx Oysterbay

Living people
21st-century Tanzanian women singers
Year of birth missing (living people)
 Swahili-language singers
 Tanzanian musicians
 Tanzanian Bongo Flava musicians